Stanley A. Enebo (November 6, 1924 – November 1, 2012) was an American politician and electrician.

Enebo was born in Minneapolis, Minnesota. He went to the Minneapolis public schools and to University of Minnesota. Enebo also went to Dunwoody College of Technology. He graduated from Metropolitan State University with a degree in labor relations. Enebo served in the United States Army during World War II. He was an electrician and was involved with real estate. Enebo served in the Minnesota House of Representatives from 1959 to 1966 and from 1971 to 1979 when he resigned from the Minnesota Legislature. Enebo was a Democrat. He then served as director of the Minnesota Public Employees Retirement Association. Enebo lived in Florida from 1987 to 2004. He died in Bellingham, Washington.

Notes

1924 births
2012 deaths
Businesspeople from Minneapolis
Politicians from Minneapolis
Military personnel from Minneapolis
Metropolitan State University alumni
University of Minnesota alumni
American electrical engineers
Democratic Party members of the Minnesota House of Representatives
20th-century American businesspeople
United States Army personnel of World War II